Events from the year 1559 in India.

Events
 The Mughal Emperor Akbar captures Ranthambore Fort

Births
 March 16 Amar Singh I, later Maharana of Mewar is born in Chittor Fort (dies 1620)

Deaths
 Sikandar Shah Suri, sixth rule of Sur dynasty
 Fernão Lopes de Castanheda, Portuguese historian and author of "History of the discovery and conquest of India" dies (born c 1500)

See also

 Timeline of Indian history